is a Japanese scriptwriter and film director from Yamanashi Prefecture. In 2011, his film Rebirth was awarded the Japanese Academy Prize for best picture.

Filmography

As director 
 The Hunter and the Hunted (2004)
 Fly, Daddy, Fly (2005)
 Midnight Eagle (2007)
 Love Fight (2008)
 The Lone Scalpel (2010)
 Isoroku (2011)
 Rebirth (2011)
 A Chair on the Plains (2013)
 Cape Nostalgia (2014)
 Solomon's Perjury 1: Suspicion (2015) 
 Solomon's Perjury 2: Judgment (2015) 
 To Each His Own (2017)
 Good-Bye (2020)
 A Morning of Farewell (2021)
 Familia (2023)
 Father of the Milky Way Railroad (2023)

References

Japanese film directors
People from Yamanashi Prefecture
1961 births
Living people
Japanese screenwriters
Writers from Yamanashi Prefecture